Ernestine Lebrun (25 February 1906 – 6 May 2005) was a French freestyle swimmer who competed in the 1920 Summer Olympics and in the 1924 Summer Olympics.

In 1920 she was eliminated in the first round of the 100 metre freestyle event as well as in the first round of the 300 metre freestyle competition. Four years later at the Paris Games she was a member of the French relay team which finished fifth in the 4 × 100 metre freestyle relay competition. She also participated in the 100 metre freestyle event and in the 400 metre freestyle competition but in both she was eliminated in the first round. In 1923 and 1925 Lebrun win the same 3 events, 100 metre freestyle, 400 metre freestyle and 1000 metre freestyle, at the French swimming championships.

References

External links
Ernestine Lebrun's profile at Sports Reference.com

1906 births
Sportspeople from Tourcoing
Olympic swimmers of France
Swimmers at the 1920 Summer Olympics
Swimmers at the 1924 Summer Olympics
2005 deaths
French female freestyle swimmers
Women's World Games medalists
20th-century French women
20th-century French people
21st-century French people